Romance, also known as Theatre of Romance, is an American anthology series that aired live on CBS on Thursday nights at 8:30 PM  from November 3, 1949 until December 29, 1949. The series aired on alternate Thursdays with Inside U.S.A. with Chevrolet.  All episodes were produced and directed by Robert Stevens.  Guest stars included Steven Hill, Lilia Skala, Bethel Leslie, and Cara Williams.

Synopsis
The series featured adaptions of famous love stories. It premiered with an updated version of Camille.

External links
Theatre of Romance at CVTA with episode list

CBS original programming
1949 American television series debuts
1949 American television series endings
American live television series
1940s American anthology television series